The IES Fortuny is a "trilingual" high school located on the Fortuny Street in Madrid, Spain.

The school consists of seven floors with each ten classrooms. A small playground can be found outside of the buildings, divided into a basketball and a volleyball court. The school also owns a gym.

External links
https://web.archive.org/web/20120814145634/http://fundacioninternationalstudies.org/2011/05/dia-de-clase-en-un-instituto-bilingue-de-madrid/
https://web.archive.org/web/20160304032320/http://www.guiasamarillas.es/empresa/4259733_ies-fortuny.html
https://web.archive.org/web/20130525132859/http://centros5.pntic.mec.es/ies.fortuny/Noticias.htm
http://www.educateca.com/centros/ies-fortuny.asp

Secondary schools in the Community of Madrid
Schools in Madrid